German submarine U-958 was a Type VIIC U-boat of Nazi Germany's Kriegsmarine during World War II. The U-boat was mainly used for training purposes until losses in other theatres prompted her relocation to operate from Norway and then against Soviet shipping in the Northern Baltic Sea.

Built in Hamburg and completed in January 1943, U-958 was given to Oberleutnant zur See Gerhard Groth, who remained with the boat for her whole operational lifespan. Earmarked for training duties in the Baltic, U-958 was based in Kiel and helped prepare other boats for operational service, as well as training up potential commanders and officers and honing tactical and operational techniques. She fulfilled this duty for the whole of 1943, before huge losses in the Battle of the Atlantic forced her to be deployed from Bergen, Norway.

Design
German Type VIIC submarines were preceded by the shorter Type VIIB submarines. U-958 had a displacement of  when at the surface and  while submerged. She had two shafts and two  propellers.

U-958 was fitted with five  torpedo tubes (four fitted at the bow and one at the stern), fourteen torpedoes, one  SK C/35 naval gun, 220 rounds, and one twin  C/30 anti-aircraft gun. The boat had a complement of between forty-four and sixty.

Service history

War patrols
Just four days after leaving Bergen on her test patrol designed to catch Allied submarines, minelayers and other craft operating off Norwegian waters, U-958 was seen and attacked by Mosquito aircraft of 333 (Norwegian) Squadron of the Royal Air Force. Their rocket and strafing attacks killed one sailor and wounded two more, forcing the boat's early return to Bergen.

A first patrol lasted twenty days amongst the fjords of Norway during June 1944, but without success, failing to find a target. The boat returned to her training duties for a short time, but was still needed in an offensive capacity, and was returned to the Baltic in the summer of 1944.

Her second patrol began on 7 September 1944, and she was tasked with operating in the Northern Baltic along the Finnish coastline. Not only was this area now being used by Soviet naval and civil shipping supplying the war zones in the Baltic states, but it also was used by Finnish vessels. During the patrol the rules of engagement with Finnish shipping changed, as Finland, once an ally of Nazi Germany, had agreed a separate peace with the Soviet Union, and was now fighting German troops on their soil in the Lapland War.

Although this patrol was a failure, soon after her return on the 11 September U-958 was sent back to the same area. This time she was to cover the withdrawal of German forces from Finland, as well as an attempt to exact some revenge on Finnish shipping. This allowed U-958 her only victories, when she torpedoed the two small Finnish coastal sailing craft Linnea and Piikio on the 24 October.

Following this third patrol, U-958 was pulled back to Kiel and did not conduct any more offensive operations, limited by fuel and opportunity.

Fate
In April 1945, most of her crew were split up and sent to other boats to replace losses, and on the 3 May, the skeleton crew which remained, took her out into Kiel roadstead and scuttled her to prevent her falling into Allied hands. Two years later the wreck was pulled from the seabed and sold for scrap.

Summary of raiding history

References

Notes

Citations

Bibliography

External links

German Type VIIC submarines
World War II submarines of Germany
U-boats commissioned in 1943
1942 ships
Ships built in Hamburg
Operation Regenbogen (U-boat)
Maritime incidents in May 1945